Andriivka is a village (selo) in Beryslav Raion, Kherson Oblast, southern Ukraine. It belongs to the Kalynivske settlement hromada, one of the hromadas of Ukraine.

Administrative status 
Until 18 July 2020, Andriivka belonged to Velyka Oleksandrivka Raion. The raion was abolished in July 2020 as part of the administrative reform of Ukraine, which reduced the number of raions of Kherson Oblast to five. The area of the Velyka Oleksandrivka Raion was merged into the Beryslav Raion.

History 
The village was founded in 1790. Andriivka was occupied by Russian forces during the 2022 Russian invasion of Ukraine. On 27 July 2022, the expulsion of Russian occupation forces was announced.

See also 
 Russian occupation of Kherson Oblast

References 

Villages in Beryslav Raion
1790 establishments